This article details the 2013-14 Santosh Trophy qualifiers.

East Zone

Group A

Group B

West Zone

Group A

Group B

North-East Zone

Group A

Group B

South Zone

North Zone

Group A

Group B

AIFF 68th Santosh Trophy 2014

References

2013–14 Santosh Trophy